English-Irish boy band One Direction have released five studio albums, ten extended plays, seventeen singles (including two charity singles), two video albums, and seventeen music videos. They signed with Simon Cowell's record label Syco Records after being formed and finishing third in the seventh series of British television singing competition The X Factor in 2010. They subsequently signed in North America with Columbia Records. One Direction: This Is Us, a 3D documentary concert film was released on 29 August 2013 in the United Kingdom and 30 August 2013 in the United States. The film captures the band on the road during the Take Me Home Tour and documents their origins and rise to fame.

The group's debut studio album Up All Night was released in November 2011. It topped the charts in sixteen countries. The lead single, "What Makes You Beautiful", was an international hit, reaching number one on the UK Singles Chart and number four on the US Billboard Hot 100; it has since been certified four and six times platinum in the US and Australia, respectively. Subsequent singles, "Gotta Be You" and "One Thing", became top ten hits in the UK. The band's second studio album Take Me Home was released in November 2012. The record sold 540,000 copies in its first week in the US and went to number-one in thirty-five countries. The album's lead single, "Live While We're Young", became One Direction's highest-peaking song in a number of countries and recorded the highest first-week sales for a song by a non-US artist. "Little Things" and "Kiss You", the succeeding singles, became moderate successes.

One Direction's third studio album, Midnight Memories, was released on 25 November 2013. The album was preceded by its lead single "Best Song Ever" and its critically acclaimed second single "Story of My Life". The album was a commercial success, debuting at number one on the UK Albums Chart and the Billboard 200, making One Direction the first band in history to have their first three albums all debut atop the Billboard 200. With their fourth album, Four, they extended the record to four consecutive number-one albums. Their next album, Made in the A.M., was preceded by its lead single "Drag Me Down". In October 2015, the band announced the second single from the album, "Perfect". As of May 2022, the band has sold more than 70 million records worldwide and over 21 million in their home country.

Albums

Studio albums

Video albums

Extended plays

Singles

As lead artist

As featured artist

Promotional singles

Other charted songs

Music videos

See also
List of songs recorded by One Direction

Notes

References

External links
One Direction discography at AllMusic

Discography
Pop music group discographies
Discographies of British artists
Discographies of Irish artists